Melanie Henriëtte Schultz van Haegen-Maas Geesteranus (born 28 June 1970) is a retired Dutch politician and businesswoman. A member of the People's Party for Freedom and Democracy (VVD), she served as Minister of Infrastructure and the Environment from 2010 to 2017.

Maas Geesteranus attended a Gymnasium in Lisse from May 1982 until June 1988 and applied at the Leiden University in June 1988 majoring in Public administration obtaining a Bachelor of Public Administration degree in July 1990 before transferring to the Erasmus University Rotterdam and graduating with a Master of Public Administration degree in July 1994. Maas Geesteranus served on the Municipal Council of Leiden from May 1994 until June 1999 and served as an Alderperson in Leiden from June 1999 until July 2002. Maas Geesteranus worked as a management consultant for B&A Group in The Hague from January 1995 until April 1997 and as a civil servant for the department of Budgetary Affairs of the Ministry of Finance from April 1997 until June 1999.

After the election of 2002 Maas Geesteranus was appointed as State Secretary for Transport and Water Management in the Cabinet Balkenende I, taking office on 22 July 2002. The Cabinet Balkenende I fell just four months later on 16 October 2002 and continued to serve in a demissionary capacity. Maas Geesteranus was elected as a Member of the House of Representatives after the election of 2003, taking office on 30 January 2003. Following the cabinet formation of 2003 Maas Geesteranus continued as State Secretary for Transport and Water Management in the Cabinet Balkenende II, taking office on 27 May 2003. The Cabinet Balkenende II fell on 30 June 2006 and continued to serve in a demissionary capacity until the first cabinet formation of 2006 when it was replaced by the caretaker Cabinet Balkenende III with Schultz van Haegen remaining as State Secretary for Transport and Water Management, taking office on 7 July 2006. On 9 August 2006 Schultz van Haegen announced her retirement from national politics and that she would not stand for the election of 2006. The Cabinet Balkenende III was replaced by the Cabinet Balkenende IV following the second cabinet formation of 2006 on 22 February 2007.

Schultz van Haegen retired from national politics and became active in the private sector and public sector and occupied numerous seats as a corporate director and nonprofit director on several boards of directors and supervisory boards (Achmea, Institute for Sound and Vision and the World Population Foundation). After the election of 2010 Schultz van Haegen was appointed as Minister of Infrastructure and the Environment in the Cabinet Rutte I, taking office 14 October 2010. The Cabinet Rutte I fell on 23 April 2012 and continued to serve in a demissionary capacity. In April 2012 Schultz van Haegen announced that she would not stand for the election of 2012. Following the cabinet formation of 2012 Schultz van Haegen remained as Minister of Infrastructure and the Environment in the Cabinet Rutte II, taking office on 5 November 2012. On 6 May 2016 Schultz van Haegen announced her retirement from national politics for a second time and that she would not stand for the election of 2017. Following the cabinet formation of 2017 Schultz van Haegen per his own request asked not to be considered for a cabinet post in the new cabinet, the Cabinet Rutte II was replaced by the Cabinet Rutte III on 26 October 2017.

Schultz van Haegen retired from national politics and returned to the private sector and public sector, in March 2018 Schultz van Haegen was named as Chief executive officer (CEO) and Chairwoman of the Board of directors of the Porticus Foundation, serving since 1 April 2018.

Decorations

References

External links

Official
  Drs. M.H. (Melanie) Schultz van Haegen-Maas Geesteranus Parlement & Politiek

 

 

 

 

1970 births
Living people
Aldermen of Leiden
Dutch corporate directors
Dutch expatriates in Belgium
Dutch management consultants
Dutch nonprofit directors
Dutch nonprofit executives
Erasmus University Rotterdam alumni
Leiden University alumni
Members of the House of Representatives (Netherlands)
Ministers of Infrastructure of the Netherlands
Municipal councillors of Leiden
Officers of the Order of Orange-Nassau
People from Leiden
People from Rheden
People's Party for Freedom and Democracy politicians
State Secretaries for Transport of the Netherlands
Women government ministers of the Netherlands
20th-century Dutch civil servants
20th-century Dutch women politicians
20th-century Dutch politicians
21st-century Dutch businesswomen
21st-century Dutch businesspeople
21st-century Dutch women politicians
21st-century Dutch politicians